The 2005 Kärcher Canadian Junior Curling Championships were held February 5-13 at the Capital Winter Club and the Lady Beaverbrook Rink in Fredericton, New Brunswick. The winning teams represented Canada at the 2005 World Junior Curling Championships.

Men's

Teams

Standings

Results

Draw 1

Draw 2

Draw 3

Draw 4

Draw 5

Draw 6

Draw 7

Draw 8

Draw 9

Draw 10

Draw 11

Draw 12

Draw 13

Draw 14

Draw 15

Draw 16

Draw 17

Draw 18

Playoffs

Semifinal

Final

Women's

Teams

Standings

Results

Draw 1

Draw 2

Draw 3

Draw 4

Draw 5

Draw 6

Draw 7

Draw 8

Draw 9

Draw 10

Draw 11

Draw 12

Draw 13

Draw 14

Draw 15

Draw 16

Draw 17

Draw 18

Playoffs

Semifinal

Final

Qualification

Ontario
The Teranet Ontario Junior Curling Championships were held January 5-9 at the Peterborough Curling Club in Peterborough.

Erin Morrissey of the Rideau Curling Club defeated Laura Payne from the Prescott Curling Club in the women's final. Payne had beaten the Leslie Bishop rink from the Weston club in Toronto 8-5 in the semifinals. 

In the men's final, Mark Bice of Sarnia defeated Mike Callan of Oakville 9-3.

External links
Women's statistics
Men's statistics

References

Canadian Junior Curling Championships
Canadian Junior Curling Championships
Curling competitions in Fredericton
Canadian Junior Curling Championships
Canadian Junior Curling Championships